Institut Agro Montpellier (previously named as Montpellier SupAgro till 2020) is a French public institution devoted to higher education and research in Agriculture, Food and Environment. Montpellier SupAgro is widely open to international issues and partnerships, with specific focus and expertise on southern and Mediterranean areas. It trains students in most of the agronomy and life sciences fields. It is part of Agropolis Fondation. The Montpellier INRA research center is also located on la Gaillarde campus.

History
The École Nationale Supérieure Agronomique de Montpellier was founded in 1848.

From 1842 to 1853, Césaire Nivière was the first director of the precursor to the school, L’Institut de la  Saulsaie, set up on his own land in Montluel. He had visited Germany where he was inspired by the farming techniques, and England where he saw techniques for water management for farmland. He was a pioneer in reducing wetlands bringing public health benefits to his area.

From 1881 to 1897, Gustave Foëx was director of the school. He was also a professor of viticulture from 1870 to 1896, and he created the school vineyard in 1876 to test the American vine-stock’s resistance to phylloxera. At the end of the 19th century, Montpellier was recognized to be the European centre for studying vines, attracting both eminent researchers and viticulture specialists to the school.

The school oriented academic course content according to the main crops and agricultural practices already existing in the South of France. Animal breeding and husbandry in harsh zones, vineyards, fruit orchards and olive groves on the plains and water management for drought conditions and marshlands

In the 1980s, the French government decided to relocate all its tropical and Mediterranean research units to Montpellier, united in Agropolis International. SupAgro is a founding member of Agropolis International with over 2000 researchers, other members include the CIRAD and IRD and the IAMM institute of higher education in agriculture for Mediterranean countries.

Education programmes 
Montpellier SupAgro offers students and professionals two engineering courses (Master level) and a wide range of programs following the European LMD framework (Bachelor, Master/Advanced Master, PhD).

Engineering training 
Montpellier SupAgro proposes an engineering training programme (Master level) offering dual specializations:

 Agricultural sciences engineering  Master Degree
 Sustainable agricultural & food systems for the south engineering Master Degree.

Masters 
It proposes also a wide range of international master’s and master’s programmes in partnership with the University of Montpellier.

 International Masters in “Agronomy and Agrifood Science” (Master 3A) with 9 specializations:
 AgroDesign
 Environmental management of tropical ecosystems and forests (GEEFT)
 Markets, organization, quality, services and policies in southern agriculture (MOQUAS)
 Resources, agricultural systems and development (RESAD)
 Plant Health
 Selection and evolution of Mediterranean and tropical plants (SEPMET)
 Soil (SOL)
 Livestock farming systems
 Vinifera EuroMaster - Vine and wine sciences
 Agris Mundus - Master of Science Sustainable Development in Agriculture
 PlantHealth European Master]
 M.Sc Biodiversity, Ecology and Evolution with two specializations:
 DARWIN
 EcoSystems
 M.Sc Biology Agrosciences with two specializations:
 Science and processing of agro-resources for the alimentation and the environment
 Interactions Micro-organisms/Hosts/Environment
 Master Water Sciences
 Water and society
 Water and agriculture
 Master of Economics of Environment, Transport and Energy, Specialization Economics of agricultural development, environment and food
 Master Marketing & Sales with two specializations:
 Wine marketing
 Agrifood marketing and sales via work-study

National Œnology Diploma 

 Œnology Diploma (Diplôme National d'Œnologue, DNO)

Postgraduate specialist diploma 

 Postgraduate specialist diploma in vine and wine management & OIV MSc in Wine Management

Advanced masters 

  Advanced M.Sc  - Innovations and Policies for Sustainable Food Systems (IPAD)

PhD programme 

 At Montpellier SupAgro, the training of PhD students is carried out in close cooperation with other universities and research organizations in and around Montpellier.

Notable people
 Pyotr Z. Bazhbeuk-Melikov (1872–1944), Bessarabian agronomist and politician; graduate
 Pierre Galet (1921–2019), French ampelographer; faculty member
 Constantin Mimi (1868–1935), Bessarabian politician; graduate

References

External links
 Institut Agro Montpellier

Montpellier SupAgro
Montpellier SupAgro
Agronomy schools
Educational institutions established in 1848
1848 establishments in France